Kossi Koudagba (2 October 1995 – 18 June 2020) was a Togolese professional footballer who played as a striker for ASC Kara of the Togolese Championnat National and the Togo national team.

Career
He played for Espoir FC Tsévié in the 2016–17 Togolese 2nd Division. For the rest of his career, he played with ASCK in the Togolese Championnat National. In November 2018, he was called up to the Togo National Team for their 2019 Africa Cup of Nations qualifier against Algeria. Koudagba made his international debut in July 2019, featuring for the full duration of a 2020 African Nations Championship qualifier with Benin in Porto-Novo. He died on 18 June 2020 from a short illness at the age of 24.

Career statistics

References

1995 births
2020 deaths
Association football forwards
Place of death missing
Togolese footballers
Togo international footballers
21st-century Togolese people